Malcolm Rose (born 1953) is a British young adult author.  Many of his books, including the Traces and Lawless and Tilley series, are mysteries or thrillers where the hero uses science to catch the criminal or terrorist.

Biography 
Malcolm Rose was born in Coventry in 1953. He studied chemistry at the University of York. Before 1996 Malcolm was a Chemistry lecturer for the Open University and many of his books have a chemistry connection. While working as a lecturer, Malcolm was also writing several of his earlier books (Rift, The OBTUSE Experiment, The Higher Form of Killing, Son of Pete Flude) and now although mainly an author he still does some chemistry lectures and visits schools. He is married to wife, Barbara, and has a son, Colin, born 1982.

As well as writing, Malcolm regularly makes visits to schools, libraries and various other venues.

Awards and commendations 
The first book of the Traces series, Framed!, has been selected by the United States Board on Books for Young People and the Children's Book Council as an Outstanding International Book for 2006. The Highest Form of Killing was nominated for an Edgar Award. Both The OBTUSE Experiment and Tunnel Vision were commended by the Young Book Trust. Tunnel Vision and Plague received the Angus Book Award, and also won the Lancashire Children's Book of the Year Award.

Bibliography 

Traces series

Framed!
Lost Bullet
Roll Call
Double Check
Final Lap
Blood Brother
Murder Club (Only available as an eBook)

Lawless and Tilley series

The Secrets of the Dead
Deep Waters
Magic Eye
Still Life
Fire and Water
Lethal Harvest
Flying Blind

Other novels
Asteroid
Hurricane Force
The Death Gene
Transplant
Clone
Plague of death
Bloodline (published as Lab 47 in German)
The Tortured Wood
Son of Pete Flude
Breathing Fear
Rift
The Highest Form of Killing
Formula for Murder
Four Degrees More
The Alibi
The Smoking Gun
Kiss of Death
Forbidden Island
Jordan Stryker: Bionic Agent
Jordan Stryker: Cyber Terror

References

External links 

Malcolm Rose Official Website
Malcolm Rose Official Forum

People from Coventry
Academics of the Open University
1953 births
Living people
Alumni of the University of York
British writers of young adult literature